Stephani is a surname, and may refer to:

 Franz Stephani (1842-1927), German bryologist
 Paul Michael Stephani (1944-1998), American serial killer
 William Stephani (died 1420s), Scottish diplomat